Kimberly Corman is a fictional character in the Final Destination series, portrayed by A. J. Cook. Kimberly serves as the protagonist of Final Destination 2. She is a college student from White Plains, New York, and is one of the survivors of the Route 23 pile-up.

Character arc

Background
Kimberly was born in White Plains, New York to Michael Corman. She is very close to her father, especially after her mother's death during a carjacking. Kimberly continues to blame herself for what happened since she stayed behind from her mother in an appliance store to watch a newsfeed about Tod Waggner's apparent suicide. Her mother was shot in their car when it was hijacked by street thugs. She is attending college with her friends Shaina McKlank, Dano Estevez, and Frankie Whitman, and was originally going to spend her spring break with her friends in Daytona Beach, Florida.

Final Destination 2
In the film, Kimberly decided to take Route 23 as a shortcut to Florida. While driving, she has an ominous vision of a highway pile-up caused by a log truck derailment; at the end of the vision, a mysterious truck coming out of nowhere rams into her car. Stalling her car sideways to prevent other drivers from going further, Kimberly and a handful of other drivers watch closely as vehicles ahead crash into one another and explode in the highway. To her surprise, another truck (the same truck that killed her at the end of her vision) smashes her SUV with her friends still in it, killing them, although she is rescued by Officer Thomas Burke. Kimberly and other survivors are interrogated by Officer Burke afterwards, with Kimberly explaining her vision similarity to Alex Browning's vision, and that they are now all in Death's list. The survivors disregard this until survivor Evan Lewis dies in his apartment later that night, alarming everyone of Death being after them. With Burke's help, Kimberly consult the help of Clear Rivers, the last survivor of Flight 180, to save the remaining others. Nevertheless, their attempts prove unsuccessful. Clear leads Kimberly and Officer Burke to mortician William Bludworth, who helps them by claiming that new life can defeat Death. Kimberly realizes that pregnant survivor Isabella Hudson can save them; however, this proves false, since Isabella was meant to live even in the premonition. After two more deaths, Kimberly sacrifices herself for Officer Burke's safety by driving the van she is riding into a lake, but Officer Burke rescues her from the van and sends her to the nearby hospital for recovery. Thinking she and Officer Burke finally cheated Death, they go to a picnic with the Gibbons family, who tell them how their son Brian was saved from death by the survivors. To everyone's surprise, Brian is blown to pieces nearby due to a barbecue grill malfunction.

Final Destination 3 alternate ending
In the "Choose Your Fate" DVD bonus edition of Final Destination 3, a newspaper blows by, revealing Kimberly and Burke ran into each other at a hardware store and a Camaro (belonging to Evan) ran through the store, knocking them into a nearby woodchipper (belonging to Peter Gibbons). Kimberly's coat was tangled and was snatched into the machine. Burke attempted to save her, and both were dismembered, with the attending physician who signed their death certificates being Dr. Ellen Kalarjian. Franchise producer Craig Perry stated that despite it not being apart of the theatrical release of the film, the newspaper article can be taken as canonical.

Literature
The character of Kimberly Corman appears in the novelization by Black Flame's authors Nancy A. Collins and Natasha Rhodes. In the novel, there are changes as to the film. Kimberly's father is named Ambrose instead of Michael as it is in the film. Like in the film, both Kimberly and Officer Burke survive.

Development

Casting and characterization
Creator Jeffrey Reddick originally envisioned Kimberly as a Black woman, but "when it got to the script stage, that description was removed and they cast a white actress." The role of Kimberly Corman was given to Canadian actress A. J. Cook, who previously starred in the 1999 film The Virgin Suicides. Reddick stated that though he felt she was "great in the role", he had hoped that a Black actress would have been considered for it as well.

Cook described her role as "a very strong girl, very determined because her mother died a year earlier, right in front of her eyes, so she's had to grow up quick." Cook added that "it's rare to find one strong female lead in a horror film, not to mention two [Larter].” Director David Ellis and producer Craig Perry were amazed by her sensitivity and vulnerability in her performance, and she was hired instantly. Ellis and Perry praised her act, with Perry stating that "[they] were at the beginning of what's going to be a long successful career for her." Ellis describe her role as "a girl who can have some fun cause they're going on a trip and they'll gonna have a good time, yet someone who can stand up to Clear, to come and challenge Clear on a race, and to bother with Clear." The character's surname was based by writer Jeffrey Reddick to American director Roger Corman, who directed the horror comedy film The Little Shop of Horrors. Originally, Kimberly and her father Michael's surname was "Burroughs" (in honor of Canadian actress Jackie Burroughs, who starred as Kate Flynn in the acclaimed crime thriller film The Grey Fox) instead of Corman in the original script, but the writers decided to change it in the script revision.

In a 2020 interview with Digital Spy, Craig Perry revealed Kimberly and Officer Thomas Burke (portrayed by Michael Landes) were originally going to be included in the climax of Final Destination 3 (2006), which saw both characters intersect with Wendy Christensen on the 081 train, effectively wrapping up the franchise. However, one of the two actors (Landes or Cook) were unavailable, so they decided not to pursue the idea. He commented further, "If we couldn't do it all the way, we decided it was best not to do it. To have just one of them leaves an open ending which would make no sense in Death's overarching plan.So we pocketed it because we knew that there was a really interesting idea about the cause and effect in the world of Final Destination, and then it managed to perfectly land in Final Destination 5 (2011).

Reception

Cook's performance met mixed reviews among critics. Robert Koehler of Variety said that "the giddy sequences also help in getting past the generally awful thesping, led by Cook, whose blurry grasp of emotions betrays Ellis' apparent disinterest in his actors." David Grove of Film Threat panned Cook's acting, stating that "she's no great actress, but she's a real looker" and teased that "since when did a horror movie suffer from having two dumb blondes as leads" (referring to Cook, who is a natural blonde in real life), the other actress referring to Larter's portrayal of Clear Rivers. Dustin Putman of TheMovieBoy.com commented about Cook's emotional scenes: Taking over where Devon Sawa's Alex took off, A. J. Cook (2001's Out Cold) is serviceable as the premonition-fueled Kimberly, but doesn't evoke enough emotion in the scenes following the brutal deaths of her close friends. Nevertheless, Robin Clifford of Reeling Reviews stated that "Cook was strident as the catalyst that sparks events with her premonitions of disaster and her fervent desire to cheat the Reaper." Brett Gallman of Oh, The Horror! claimed that Cook and fellow actor Michael Landes were "serviceable as leads."

References

Fictional attempted suicides
Fictional characters from Georgia (U.S. state)
Fictional characters from New York (state)
Fictional characters with precognition
Film characters introduced in 2003
Final Destination characters
Final girls